Heather O'Brien (born 22 July 1984) is a female Irish rugby union player. She was in 's 2014 Women's Rugby World Cup squad. She scored a try in 's victory over the Black Ferns at the 2014 World Cup.

O'Brien studied Physical therapy at Queen Margaret University. She runs her own clinic, the North Cork Physiotherapy & Acupuncture Clinic, in Mallow, County Cork. She was awarded the Evening Echo Ladies Sportstar of the Month for August 2014.

References

1984 births
Living people
Irish female rugby union players
Ireland women's international rugby union players
Rugby union players from County Cork